GCLP may refer to:

 International Civil Aviation Organization-Code for the Gran Canaria Airport
 Good Clinical Laboratory Practice, a GxP guideline for laboratory samples from clinical studies